Jeffrey N. Wasserstrom is an American historian of modern China. He is Chancellor's Professor of History at the University of California, Irvine. Wasserstrom's research interests began with the role of student protest and have grown to include the social history of China and comparative social history.  Wasserstrom also writes about China for a popular audience.

Education 
Wasserstrom received his B.A from the University of California, Santa Cruz in 1982. He received his M.A from Harvard University in 1984 and his Ph.D from the University of California, Berkeley in 1989.

Career 
Before joining the faculty at the University of California, Irvine in 2006, Wasserstrom taught at University of Kentucky and Indiana University. In 2009, Wasserstrom became editor of Journal of Asian Studies.

Wasserstrom's first monograph was entitled Student Protests in the 20th Century: The View from Shanghai. In the book, Wasserstrom pays particular attention to symbols used by student protesters in Shanghai.  Wasserstrom argues that students became particularly good at mimicking the practices of government officials which made their causes seem legitimate. Professor of History, David Strand praised the monograph as a "major contribution," because it "offers a model for rethinking the late imperial, republican and communist periods as a historical unit conditioned by indigenous and global forces, and explained by sinological and comparative models."   In 2009, Routledge released a book by Wasserstrom entitled Global Shanghai which includes seven chapters that analyze the globalization of Shanghai during seven 25 year periods. Global Shanghai analyzes the popular image that Shanghai has been the hub of Sino-foreign cultural interaction since 1850.  Wasserstrom argues that historians should be suspicious of those who propagate this image but that historians should not underestimate the city's potential for cultural innovation.  Alongside these books, Wasserstrom has written articles for and edited several anthologies.

Wasserstrom has lamented that Westerners know very little about China. For this reason, Wasserstrom has written extensively for a popular audience. Wasserstrom has written for Time magazine, Newsweek, The Nation, the Los Angeles Times and The New York Times.  Wasserstrom is the co-founder of a blog entitled the China Beat, and he blogs regularly for the Huffington Post.  Wasserstrom wrote a successful book entitled China in the 21st Century: What Everyone Needs to Know. The first edition, which came out in 2010, was quickly followed by a second edition in 2013. The book contains an overview of recent Chinese history and includes corrections of common American misunderstandings about China including misunderstandings about the  Tiananmen Square protests of 1989 and China's One-child policy.  Wasserstrom argues that the most common American misunderstanding of China is that China is culturally homogeneous.  Wasserstrom notes that like the United States, China has enormous ethnic, cultural, and religious diversity.  The book also contains an overview of the issues that China faces today.  Professor of Political Science, Barrett L. McCormick had some misgivings about Wasserstrom's assessment of Mao Zedong which was that Mao was more like Andrew Jackson in that he was a man of the people who committed some atrocities than he was like Adolf Hitler; however, McCormick wrote, "if someone asks you to recommend a first book on China that he or she can read on the plane, this is the best book available."

Publications
 Vigil: Hong Kong on the Brink. Columbia Global Reports, 2020.
 China in the 21st Century: What Everyone Needs to Know.  Oxford University Press, 2010 and 2013.
 Chinese Characters: Profiles of Fast-Changing Lives in a Fast-Changing Land. University of California Press, 2012.
 China in 2008: A Year of Great Significance. Rowman & Littlefield, 2009.
 Global Shanghai, 1850-2010. Routledge, 2008.
 "Beijing Games Call to Mind Our Fair." Chicago Tribune, September 2, 2008.
 "What Would Mao Think of the Games?" The Nation, August 22, 2008.
 "China's Brave New World--And Other Tales for Global Times." Indiana University Press, 2007.
 "New Ways in History, 1966-2006." History Workshop Journal 64, no. 1, 2007: 271-294.
 Human Rights and Revolutions, second edition, edited with Lynn Hunt, Marilyn B. Young and Greg Grandin. Rowman and Littlefield, 2007, .
 Chinese Femininities Chinese Masculinities. University of California Press, 2002.
 Popular Protest and Political Culture in Modern China. Westview Press, 1992 and 1994 editions.
 Student Protests in Twentieth-Century China: The View from Shanghai. Stanford University Press, 1991.

References

Bibliography
Bailey, Paul.  "Student Protests in 20th Century China." Bulletin of the School of Oriental and African Studies, University of London 56, no. 3 (1993):621-622.
"Jeffrey Wasserstrom." Amazon. Accessed April 22, 2014. https://www.amazon.com/Jeffrey-N.-Wasserstrom/e/B001IQWGPW
"Jeffrey Wasserstrom." The Huffington Post. Accessed April 21, 2014. http://www.huffingtonpost.com/jeffrey-wasserstrom/.
"Jeffrey Wasserstrom." UC Irvine Department of History. Accessed April 21, 2014. http://www.humanities.uci.edu/history/faculty_profile_wasserstrom.php.
Strand, David. "Student Protests in Twentieth-Century China: The View from Shanghai by Jeffrey Wasserstrom." The Journal of Asian Studies 51, no. 3 (August 1992): 660-662.
McCormick, Barret L. "China in the 21st Century: What Everyone Needs to Know." The Journal of Asian Studies 70, no. 1 (February 2011): 216-218.
"The Journal of Asian Studies (JAS)." The Association for Asian Studies. https://www.asian-studies.org/publications/JAS.htm.
Wasserstrom, Jeffrey. China in the 21st Century: What Everyone Needs to Know. New York: Oxford University Press, 2010.
Wasserstrom, Jeffrey.  Global Shanghai, 1850-2010. New York: Routledge, 2009.
"Who We Are." The China Beat. Accessed April 21, 2014.  http://www.thechinabeat.org/?page_id=7.

External links 
"China in the 21st Century: What Japan Needs to Know"

Living people
Harvard University alumni
University of California, Berkeley alumni
University of California, Irvine faculty
University of California, Santa Cruz alumni
Year of birth missing (living people)
The Journal of Asian Studies editors